Archeosetus is a genus of mites in the Phytoseiidae family.

Species
 Archeosetus rackae (Fain, 1987)

References

Phytoseiidae